Sada El-Balad (lit. “Nation’s Echo”) is an Egyptian news website and satellite television channel established in 2011. It is owned by businessman Mohamed M. Abou El Enein and features journalist Ahmed Sabry as its founding Editor-in-Chief.

References

External links

Website page
Facebook page
Twitter page
YouTube channel
Instagram page
Arabic-language television stations
Television stations in Egypt